Football Club Pavlikeni are a Bulgarian football club based in Pavlikeni, who compete in the North-West Third League, the third division of Bulgarian football.

History
The club was founded as Hadzhislavchev in 1928. In 1954, the club won promotion for the A Group for first time in the club's history. The team won just five games in their first A Group campaign in the 1955 season and were relegated, finishing on the last 14th place.

Current squad

League positions

References

External links
 Pavlikeni at Bulgarian Club Directory

Pavlikeni
1928 establishments in Bulgaria